Dasht-e Azadegan (also Romanized as Dasht-e Āzādegān) is a village in Garmsir Rural District, in the Central District of Ardestan County, Isfahan Province, Iran. At the 2006 census, its population was 30, in 7 families.

References 

Populated places in Ardestan County